John H. Mills is a South Dakota politician, and currently serves in the South Dakota House of Representatives.

Tenure in State House of Representatives
On February 24, 2022, Mills introduced a House Resolution entitled "Addressing the Governor's unacceptable actions in matters related to the appraiser certification program" against fellow Republican Governor Kristi Noem.

References

Living people
Republican Party members of the South Dakota House of Representatives
People from Brookings County, South Dakota
21st-century American politicians
Year of birth missing (living people)